Written in Blood is the third and final album from Cheap Sex, recorded with Punk Core Records.

Track listing 
 "Worst Enemy" - 3:01
 "War's No Game" - 2:11
 "Excuses" - 2:53
 "Psychopath" - 1:46
 "No Time for You" - 1:49
 "Rage and Revenge" - 2:04
 "Written in Blood" - 2:28
 "Fear in the Night" - 3:01
 "Russian Roulette" - 1:40
 "Secret Agenda" - 2:19
 "Youth Offender" - 2:50
 "Nothing to Gain" - 1:50
 "Paranoia" - 3:50
 "Manslaughter" - 2:27

Members
 Mike Virus - Vocals
 Phil Robles - Lead guitar
 Johnny O. - Rhythm guitar
 Gabe - Drums
 Brock - Bass

Credits
 Alan Douches - Mastering
 Jeff Forrest - Engineer

Cheap Sex albums
Punk Core Records albums
2006 albums